Rankin Inlet Airport  is located at Rankin Inlet, Nunavut, Canada, and is operated by the government of Nunavut.

In December 2005 the Government of Nunavut announced that they would spend $3 million to improve the Instrument Landing System and expand the apron.

Canadian NORAD Region Forward Operating Location Rankin Inlet is located on the southwest side of the runway and shares the use of the runway when operations necessitate.

Airlines and destinations

References

External links

Certified airports in the Kivalliq Region